São Francisco de Assis, Portuguese for Saint Francis of Assisi, may refer to:

 São Francisco de Assis, Rio Grande do Sul, municipality in the State of Rio Grande do Sul, Brazil
 São Francisco de Assis do Piauí, municipality in the State of Piauí, Brazil

See also
 São Francisco (disambiguation)
 Church of Saint Francis of Assisi